My Leopold may refer to:
 My Leopold (play), a 1873 play by Adolphe L'Arronge 
 My Leopold (1914 film), a silent German film directed by Heinrich Bolten-Baeckers
 My Leopold (1919 film), a silent German film directed by Heinrich Bolten-Baeckers
 My Leopold (1924 film), a silent German film directed by Heinrich Bolten-Baeckers
 My Leopold (1931 film), a German film directed by Hans Steinhoff 
 My Leopold (1955 film), a West German film directed by Géza von Bolváry